Coconut Development Board (CDB) is a statutory body established under the Ministry of Agriculture of the Government of India for the integrated development of coconut and coconut-related products. Coconut Development Board is a statutory body established by the Government of India for the integrated development of coconut production and utilization in the country with focus on productivity increase and product diversification. The Board which came into existence on 12 January 1981, functions under the administrative control of the Ministry of Agriculture, Government of India, with its headquarters at Kochi in Kerala and regional Offices at Bangalore in Karnataka, Chennai in Tamil Nadu and  Guwahati in Assam. There are six state centres situated at Bhubaneswar in Orissa, Calcutta in West Bengal, Patna in Bihar, Thane in Maharashtra, Hyderabad in Andhra Pradesh and Port Blair in the Union Territory of Andaman & Nicobar Islands. The Board has 9 Demonstration cum Seed Production (DSP) Farms in different locations of the country and now 7 farms are maintained. A Market Development cum Information Centre has established in Delhi. The Board has set up a Technology Development Centre at Vazhakulam near Aluva in Kerala.

See also
Coconut production in India
Coconut production in Kerala

References

External links
 

Coconut organizations
Agricultural organisations based in India
Companies based in Kochi
Government agencies of India
Ministry of Agriculture & Farmers' Welfare
Commodity markets in Kerala
1981 establishments in Kerala
Government agencies established in 1981